McGiverin is a surname. Notable people with the surname include:

 Arthur A. McGiverin (1928–2019), American judge
 Harold McGiverin (1870–1931), Canadian politician
 William McGiverin (1825–1881), Canada-West politician